Alia Bhatt is an Indian actress who is known for her work in Hindi films. Bhatt has 43 awards to her credit. She is the recipient of four Filmfare Awards: one Best Actress (Critics) for film Highway (2014) and three Best Actress for the crime drama Udta Punjab (2016), the spy thriller Raazi (2018) and the musical drama Gully Boy (2019). She has received additional Filmfare nominations for Best Actress for Highway (2014), the coming-of-age film Dear Zindagi (2016), and the romantic comedy Badrinath Ki Dulhania (2017); and for Best Female Debut for Student of the Year (2012).

Bhatt was awarded the Screen Award and IIFA Award for Best Actress for Udta Punjab (2016), and won the Zee Cine Award for Best Actor – Female for Badrinath Ki Dulhania (2017), Raazi (2018) and Gully Boy (2019), For Raazi (2018), she won a second Screen Award and second IIFA Award for Best Actress. She won her third Screen Award for Gully Boy (2019).

Film awards

2010s

2020s

Other awards and recognition

2017 
 Forbes 30 Under 30

References

External links 
 

Lists of awards received by Indian actor
Lists of awards received by British actor